Potato yellow mosaic virus (PYMV) is a plant pathogenic virus of the family Geminiviridae.

External links
ICTVdB - The Universal Virus Database: Potato yellow mosaic virus

Begomovirus
Viral plant pathogens and diseases